The Samsung Galaxy Z Fold 4 (stylized as Samsung Galaxy Z Fold4) is a foldable smartphone that is part of the Samsung Galaxy Z series. It was announced at the August 2022 edition of Galaxy Unpacked alongside the Galaxy Z Flip 4. It was released on August 25, 2022. It is the successor to the Galaxy Z Fold 3.

Specifications

Design 
The Z Fold 4's outer display and back panel use Gorilla Glass Victus+, whilst the foldable inner display is made of Samsung's proprietary "Ultra-Thin Glass", with two protective plastic layers covering it.

The Z Fold 4 has an IPX8 ingress protection rating for water resistance, with dust resistance not being rated. The outer frame is constructed from aluminum, marketed as 'Armor Frame' by Samsung.

The Samsung Galaxy Z Fold 4 is available in four colors: Phantom Black, Beige, Graygreen and Burgundy.

Hardware 
The Galaxy Z Fold 4 has two screens: its 6.2-inch cover display, and its foldable inner 7.6-inch display, featuring support for the S Pen Pro and the S Pen Fold Edition. Both displays have a 120 Hz variable refresh rate. Compared to the Z Fold 3, the inner display has a more squarish aspect ratio while the cover display is slightly wider.

The device has 12 GB of RAM, and either 256 GB, 512 GB or 1 TB of UFS 3.1 flash storage, with no support for expanding the device's storage capacity via micro-SD cards.

The Z Fold 4 is powered by the Qualcomm Snapdragon 8+ Gen 1.

The device's included battery is a 4400 mAh dual-cell unit that fast charges via USB-C up to 25 W, or via wireless charging up to 15 W. 

The Z Fold 4 features three rear cameras, including a 50 MP wide-angle camera, a 12 MP ultra-wide camera, and a 10 MP telephoto camera. The wide camera shares its sensor with the S22 and S22+, replacing the previous 12 MP sensor, and the telephoto camera has been upgraded from 2x to 3x optical zoom. It has two front-facing cameras, with a 10 MP camera on the cover display and a 4 MP under-display camera on the right half of the inner display.

Software 
The Samsung Galaxy Z Fold 4 ships with Android 12L based One UI 4.1.

Gallery

References

External links 
 

Samsung Galaxy
Foldable smartphones
Mobile phones introduced in 2022
Mobile phones with multiple rear cameras
Mobile phones with 4K video recording
Mobile phones with 8K video recording
Dual screen phone
Flagship smartphones
Samsung smartphones